Iglesia de San Pedro (Alles) is a historic church in Asturias, Spain, established in 1787.

See also
Asturian art
Catholic Church in Spain
Church of San Pedro de Plecín

References

Churches in Asturias
Roman Catholic churches completed in 1787
1787 establishments in Spain
18th-century Roman Catholic church buildings in Spain